In Modern English, he is a singular, masculine, third-person pronoun.

Morphology  
In Standard Modern English, he has four shapes representing five distinct word forms:

 he: the nominative (subjective) form
 him: the accusative (objective) form (also called the oblique case)
 his: the dependent and independent genitive (possessive) forms
 himself: the reflexive form

History
Old English had a single third-person pronoun — from the Proto-Germanic demonstrative base *khi-, from PIE *ko- "this" — which had a plural and three genders in the singular. The modern pronoun it developed out of the neuter singular, starting to appear without the h in the 12th century. Her developed out of the feminine singular dative and genitive forms, while the other feminine forms and the plural were replaced with other words. The older pronoun had the following forms:

In the 12th century, it started to separate and appear without an h. Around the same time, one case was lost, and distinct pronouns started to develop. The -self forms developed in early Middle English, with hine self becoming himself. By the 15th century, the Middle English forms of he had solidified into those we use today.

Gender 

He had three genders in Old English, but in Middle English, the neuter and feminine genders split off. Today, he is the only masculine pronoun in English. In the 18th century, it was suggested as a gender-neutral pronoun, and was thereafter often prescribed in manuals of style and school textbooks until around the 1960s. In 2019 the Meriam-Webster dictionary added the singular they after seeing a spike in search interest.

Syntax

Functions 
He can appear as a subject, object, determiner or predicative complement. The reflexive form also appears as an adjunct. He occasionally appears as a modifier in a noun phrase.

 Subject: He's there; him being there; his being there; he paid for himself to be there.
 Object: I saw him; I introduced her to him; He saw himself.
 Predicative complement: The only person there was him.
 Dependent determiner: I met his friend.
 Independent determiner: This is his.
 Adjunct: He did it himself.
 Modifier: The he goat was missing.

Dependents 
Pronouns rarely take dependents, but it is possible for he to have many of the same kind of dependents as other noun phrases.

 Relative clause modifier: he who arrives late
 Determiner: A: Somebody was here, and he left this. B: I'm that he.
 Adjective phrase modifier: the real him
 Adverb phrase external modifier: Not even him

Semantics 
He's referents are generally limited to individual male persons, excluding the speaker and the addressee. He is always definite and usually specific.

Generic 
The pronoun he can be used to refer to an unspecified person, as in If you see someone in trouble, help him. (See Gender above). This can seem very unnatural, even ungrammatical, as in these examples: 

 ?When somebody gives birth, it's good for him to have assistance.
 ?If either your mother or father would like to discuss it, I'll talk to him.

The dominant epicene pronoun in modern written British English is 'they'. Many style guides now reject the generic 'he'.

Deities
When speaking of God, Jesus Christ or the Holy Spirit, some Christians use the capitalised forms "He", "His" and "Him" in writing, and in some translations of the Bible.

Pronunciation 
According to the OED, the following pronunciations are used:

References

Notes

Further reading
 "He", The American Heritage Dictionary of the English Language, Fourth edition, (Boston: Houghton Mifflin Company, 2000).

See also
 English personal pronouns
Gender neutrality in languages with gendered third-person pronouns
 Generic antecedent
 Third-person pronoun

English grammar
Modern English personal pronouns
Middle English personal pronouns
Old English personal pronouns
Terms for men